Mark Flekken (born 13 June 1993) is a Dutch professional footballer who plays as a goalkeeper for Bundesliga club SC Freiburg and the Netherlands national team.

Early years
Flekken grew up in Bocholtz, Limburg, Netherlands on the German border. His parents René and Annie used to play football themselves, and his younger brother Roy also became a goalkeeper.

Club career

Alemannia Aachen and Greuther Fürth
Flekken started his career in the youth department of RKVV WDZ from Bocholtz before moving to the youth academy of Roda JC Kerkrade. In 2009, he moved across the border to the youth teams of the then 2. Bundesliga club Alemannia Aachen. On 22 September 2011, he signed his first professional contract.

During the winter break of the 2012–13 3. Liga season, Flekken was appointed as the starting goalkeeper by coach René van Eck after the financially troubled club had parted ways with Michael Melka. Flekken made his debut on 26 January 2013 in a 2–0 home game against 1. FC Saarbrücken.

Ahead of the 2013–14 season, Flekken moved to the 2. Bundesliga club SpVgg Greuther Fürth. There, he only made three league appearances in three years as a backup goalkeeper behind Wolfgang Hesl and Sebastian Mielitz.

MSV Duisburg
Flekken signed for MSV Duisburg on 12 June 2016. On 7 August 2016, he scored a goal, after a corner, in a 1–1 draw against VfL Osnabrück, when he went to the opposite box during the last minute. In February 2018, Flekken conceded a goal in a 2. Bundesliga match against FC Ingolstadt, when he turned his back on the play to take a drink from his water bottle.

SC Freiburg
Flekken joined SC Freiburg for the 2018–19 season. A backup to Alexander Schwolow throughout the season, he made his debut in the final matchday of the 2018–19 season against 1. FC Nürnberg. After Schwolow's departure before the start of the 2020–21 season, he was appointed the new starter, but shortly after he suffered a complicated elbow injury while warming up for the DFB-Pokal match against SV Waldhof Mannheim which sidelined him for the entire season. Meanwhile, he was replaced in goal by Florian Müller, who was on loan from Mainz 05. He returned as the starter in goal on 9 May 2021; before that he had regained match practice with the Freiburg reserves in the Regionalliga Südwest.

Flekken started the 2021–22 season as the undisputed first-choice goalkeeper and, after ten games in a row without defeat, saw the team in third place of the league, to which he had contributed with the league's best rate of shots saved.

International career
Flekken was called up to the senior Netherlands national team squad for the 2022 FIFA World Cup qualification matches against Montenegro and Norway on 13 and 16 November 2021, respectively.

Flekken made his international debut for the Netherlands on 26 March 2022 in a friendly match against Denmark as a starter.

Career statistics

Club

References

External links

1993 births
Living people
Sportspeople from Kerkrade
Dutch footballers
Association football goalkeepers
Bundesliga players
2. Bundesliga players
3. Liga players
Regionalliga players
Roda JC Kerkrade players
Alemannia Aachen players
SpVgg Greuther Fürth players
SpVgg Greuther Fürth II players
MSV Duisburg players
SC Freiburg players
Dutch expatriate footballers
Dutch expatriate sportspeople in Germany
Expatriate footballers in Germany
Footballers from Limburg (Netherlands)